Maxell Aqua Park Shinagawa (ja: マクセルアクアパーク品川, Makuseru Akua Pāku Shinagawa), formerly Epson Aqua Park Shinagawa, Epson Shinagawa Aqua Stadium is a public aquarium located inside the Shinagawa Prince Hotel in Minato, Tokyo. It can be accessed from Shinagawa Station.

History

On April 8, 2005, "Epson Shinagawa Aqua Stadium" opened on the premises of the Shinagawa Prince Hotel.
Many attractions are held at the aquarium in the center of the city operated by Yokohama Hakkeijima Sea Paradise, and a charter wedding party is also held at the aquarium.  

It was closed for renovations on January 5, 2015. The facility's name was changed to "Epson Aqua Park Shinagawa" and it was reopened on July 10.

On April 1, 2016, the name was changed to "Aqua Park Shinagawa" due to the expiration of the naming rights contract with Epson Sales Japan.

On October 26, 2017, Maxell Holdings acquired naming rights under a contract.
It is a popular aquarium in the city center, and the annual number of visitors exceeds 1.5 million every year. In 2019, the number of public aquarium visitors in Japan is ranked fourth in JAZA's annual report.

Exhibits

Since partnering with Epson and Maxell, aquariums have incorporated projection mapping into entrancehall and dolphin shows. The stadium has 1,350 seats, and there are shows by Pacific white-sided dolphins, bottlenose dolphins, and false killer whales that make full use of technology such as water curtains.

Also, the dolphin show at The Stadium is different day and night.

A dome-shaped tunnel fishtank with a total length of  named "Wonder Tube" is installed in the facility. In Wonder Tube, 
about 15 species of rays of various sizes, including manta rays, are captivity. This aquarium has the only facilities in the world where Dwarf sawfish are captivity. There are events such as an experience corner where you can feeding krill to manta rays.

Various creatures are exhibited on "Wild Street", and Penguins, Sea Turtles, and Fur seal are captivity there.  Many Fur seal and Otters and Sea lion are on display at the small outdoor stadium "Friendly Square".

There is an event live hall called "Stellar Ball" on the grounds of the building. This live hall was produced and named by Yumi Matsutoya.  1st floor has 1,758 standing seats and 750 seats, and 2nd floor has 126 seats on the terrace and VIP seats.

Facilities
The facility is a two-story building with attractions on the first floor and The stadium where the dolphin show is held and tunnel fishtanks on the second floor.

Attractions 

Dolphin party (merry go round)
Port of Pirates (Viking)

Ground floor 

 Park entrance
 Magical ground
 Coral cafe bar
 Jerry Fish Rumble
 Stellar ball

Upper floor 

 The stadium
 Little paradise
 Wonder tube
 Life Museum
 Aqua jungle
 Wild street
 Friendly Square
 Aqua Shop Luce

Gallery
Dolphin show

aquarium

See also

Facilities with the same Management
Yokohama Hakkeijima Sea Paradise
Sendai Umino-Mori Aquarium 
Itabashi Botanical Garden 
 EPSON 
 Maxell

References

External links
 Official Site 
 Official Site 
 StelaBall
 Maxell Aqua park Shinagawa Maxell Official Site 

Animal theme parks
Aquaria in Japan
Amusement parks opened in 2005
Buildings and structures in Minato, Tokyo
Amusement parks in Japan
Seibu Group